Mansion in Chocicza Wielka is a manor house from the turn of the nineteenth and twentieth century, situated in the village Chocicza Wielka, located in the Wielkopolska province, in the district of Września | Wrzesnia, in the municipality of Wrzesnia. Manor was built for the German family von Jouanne'ów.

Description 
The mansion was built on a high basement, has one storey. The living space is located in the mansard roof. From the garden on the facade built one above the other semicircular balconies from which the bottom is wider. From both sides of the long facades are high projections, with front projection is divided by pilasters. The surrounding park was an inserted during the construction of the manor.

History 
The manor was built at the turn of the nineteenth and twentieth centuries, and its owner in 1930 was Maximilian von Jouanna. Four years previously assets counted 1,540 hectares, and on its territory are a brick factory and distillery.

Gallery

References 

Września